Jeff Bonwick invented and led development of the ZFS file system, which was used in Oracle Corporation's ZFS storage products as well as startups including Nexenta, Delphix, Joyent, and Datto, Inc.  Bonwick is also the inventor of slab allocation,  which is used in many operating systems including MacOS and Linux, and the LZJB compression algorithm.

His roles included Sun Fellow, Sun Storage CTO, and Oracle vice president.

History 

In 2010 Bonwick co-founded a small company called DSSD with Mike Shapiro and Bill Moore, and became chief technical officer.  He co-invented DSSD's system hardware architecture and software. He developed DSSD's whole-system simulator, which enabled the team to explore possible hardware topologies and software algorithms. DSSD was acquired by EMC Corporation in 2014, which then became part of Dell Technologies in 2016.
By the end of 2016, Bill Moore had left the company, while Bonwick remained as CTO. The DSSD product, called D5, was cancelled in March 2017.

References

Year of birth missing (living people)
Living people
Open source people
Free software programmers
American computer scientists
Place of birth missing (living people)
American computer programmers
Solaris people
Sun Microsystems people